Congleton Upper Junction was a railway station which served the town of Congleton. The station was on the Stoke on Trent to Congleton loop line.

The station was opened by the North Staffordshire Railway on 1 June 1864 and closed a few days later.

References

Former North Staffordshire Railway stations
Disused railway stations in Cheshire
Railway stations in Great Britain closed in 1864
Congleton